Renzo Sambo (17 January 1942 – 10 August 2009) was an Italian rower who had his best achievements in the coxed pairs, together with Primo Baran and coxswain Bruno Cipolla. They won a European title in 1967 and an Olympic gold in 1968.

Sambo then changed to the coxed fours, but with less success. During his career he won 15 national titles in various events. In retirement he worked as a coach with Circolo Ospedalieri Treviso, which organizes the Renzo Sambo Memorial Regatta since 2009.

References

External links

 

1942 births
2009 deaths
Italian male rowers
Olympic rowers of Italy
Olympic gold medalists for Italy
Rowers at the 1968 Summer Olympics
Olympic medalists in rowing
World Rowing Championships medalists for Italy
Medalists at the 1968 Summer Olympics
Rowers at the 1972 Summer Olympics
European Rowing Championships medalists